Tom Reilly (born 1960) is an Irish author and former regional newspaper columnist (Life of Reilly, Drogheda Independent), who has written books on Oliver Cromwell and religion, (Hollow Be Thy Name) as well as a book based on his own newspaper columns.

Biography

Reilly is currently the manager of Ardgillan Castle, located between Balbriggan and Skerries in Ireland. He has published ten books, three of which have been conventionally published, the other seven have been self-published. A native of Drogheda, County Louth, Reilly is a director of a local printing company, Burex Manufacturing Ltd. of Dunleer, Louth. He spent most of his working life in the printing and allied trades and is an avid local historian. He set up the Drogheda Heritage Centre along with his wife, Noeleen in 1999 in St Mary's Church of Ireland, Drogheda, the site of Cromwell's entry into the town in 1649. The Centre caused local controversy when Cromwell's death mask was displayed for two months under the slogan 'He's Back!' While the death mask was on display protests were led by the Deputy Mayor of Drogheda, Frank Godfrey daubed tomato juice on the walls of the graveyard surrounding the Centre. 'Cromwell Was Framed (Ireland 1649)', the first major book from new imprint Chronos Books appeared on the bookshelves in 2014. Drogheda's Forgotten Walls (and other stories) was published in December 2015. 

He is married to Noeleen (Crinion) and has two children, Cathy and Eoin.

Reilly's best-known work on Cromwell, 
Cromwell – An Honourable Enemy: The Untold Story of the Cromwellian Invasion of Ireland (1999), which holds that Cromwell did not intentionally target civilians during the campaign. He was quoted as stating: "Cromwell's entire Irish mission was fought on a purely military basis, and it is to his enormous credit that he never once departed from those parameters." The central thesis of this argument has been challenged by leading Irish historians.

Cromwell – An Honourable Enemy: The Untold Story of the Cromwellian Invasion of Ireland

Positive reviews
 The Sunday Times review of the book called it "... an important book ... scrupulous in [his] examination of evidence ... assiduous in research and [he] quotes primary sources extensively. Above all, he understands that the past should not be judged by the standards and fashions of the 1990s."  
 A 2008 study by historian Philip Graham McKeiver, A New History of Cromwell's Irish Campaign, supports Reilly's thesis: This spirited new account of Oliver Cromwell's Irish Campaign of 1649–50 is based upon close reading of printed primary sources, especially Thomas Carlyle's edition of Cromwell's letters and speeches, and a wide range of secondary works... in each case beginning by setting out a number of myths, misunderstandings, and misconceptions and then seeking to correct and demythologise those points... Some of these myths and false ideas are quite easily and quickly disposed of... the author's vigorous reinvestigation ruefully but surely correctly notes that it suited both nations to magnify the actions of Cromwell in Ireland, in ways that prostituted history to political and religious propaganda.

Negative reviews
 Eugene Coyle's lengthy review of Cromwell – An Honourable Enemy concludes: "it is written in an emotive, excitable style with irrelevant extraneous material... He contradicts what has been established by a large number of modern professional historians such as Michael Burke, Peter Gaunt, John Morrill, Antonia Fraser and others...There is a need for a new book on the Irish Cromwellian campaign but unfortunately this is not it."
 Rewriting Cromwell: A Case of Deafening Silences, by historian and President of the Cromwell Association, Professor John Morrill, opined that the work constituted a "major attempt at rehabilitation was attempted by Tom Reilly ... but this has been largely rejected by other scholars." 

Both Cromwell in Ireland (2008) and The Story of Ireland (2010) were major Irish TV (RTE) documentaries (repeats are still aired on digital stations), conclude that Cromwell was guilty of wholesale civilian atrocities and almost completely ignore any revisionist work.

Reilly responded to academic criticism by publishing a further work 'Cromwell Was Framed (Ireland 1649)', in which he counters his academic detractors (Prof. John Morrill, Prof. Micheál Ó'Siochrú, Dr. Jason McElligott and Dr. Pádraig Lenihan), by the inclusion of contemporary documents.

Amongst Reilly's assertions, is the identity of two contemporary individuals of whom he cites as personally responsible for creating the alleged myth that Cromwell deliberately killed unarmed men, women and children at both Drogheda and Wexford, and that a 1649 London newspaper reported that Cromwell's penis had been shot off at Drogheda.

Bibliography

Joe Stanley – Printer to the Rising, Brandon Books (2005); 
Tracing Drogheda's Medieval Walls, North East Printers (1995)
The Story of Drogheda, North East Printers (1998)
Drogheda United – The Story So Far, Anglo Printers (2007)
 Cromwell Was Framed (Ireland 1649)  April 2014. Chronos Books (An imprint of John Hunt Publishing)
 Drogheda's Forgotten Walls (and other stories) Beula Print (2015)

References

1960 births
Living people
Irish columnists
20th-century Irish historians
21st-century Irish historians
Irish non-fiction writers
Irish male non-fiction writers
People from Drogheda
Date of birth missing (living people)
Revisionism (Ireland)